The Transfiguration Cathedral (Spaso-Preobrazhensky  sobor) on a steep bluff overlooking the Amur River in Khabarovsk stands 96 meters tall and is supposed to be the third tallest church in Russia after St. Isaac's Cathedral and the Cathedral of Christ the Saviour. It was built over 2001-2004 to a traditional design reminiscent of Konstantin Thon's works. The church is surmounted by four Ukrainian-style gilded domes, the central one being the largest. Its spectacular location on a hill was chosen by Patriarch of Moscow and all Rus' Alexis II of Moscow during a helicopter flight over Khabarovsk.

References

See also 
 Khabarovsk City Cathedral
 List of tallest Orthodox church buildings

Russian Orthodox cathedrals in Russia
Khabarovsk
Buildings and structures in Khabarovsk Krai
Tourist attractions in Khabarovsk Krai